Gillett is a surname. Notable people with the surname include:

Aden Gillett (born 1958), British actor
Aidan Gillett (born 1986), Australian actor and stunt performer
Alan Gillett (disambiguation)
Amy Gillett (1976–2005), Australian track cyclist and rower
Andrew Gillett, Australian historian
Burt Gillett (1891–1971), American director of animated films
Charlie Gillett (1942–2010), British radio presenter, musicologist and writer
Dave Gillett (born 1951), Scottish retired footballer
David Gillett (born 1945), British Anglican bishop
David Gillett (cricketer) (born 1969), former English cricketer
Debra Gillett, English actress
Edward Frank Gillett (1874–1927), British artist and illustrator.
Emma Gillett (1852–1927), American lawyer and women's rights activist
Eric William Gillett (1899–1987), Australian lawyer and university officer
Ezra Hall Gillett (1823–1875), American clergyman and author
Frederick H. Gillett (1851–1935), former US Speaker of the House, US Representative and US Senator from Massachusetts
Fred Gillett (astronomer) (1937–2001), American astronomer
George Gillett (disambiguation)
Sir Harold Gillett, 1st Baronet (1890–1976), Lord Mayor of London
Herbert Gillett (born 1915), merchant and politician in Newfoundland
Hugh Gillett (1836–1915), English first-class cricketer and clergyman
Ian Gillett (1928–2008), Australian rules footballer
Ivor Gillett (1928–1950), George Cross recipient
 Katharine Gillett-Gatty (1870-1952), journalist, lecturer and militant suffragette 
James B. Gillett (1856–1937) Texas Ranger
James Gillett (1860–1937), Republican politician and 22nd Governor of California from 1907 to 1911
Jarred Gillett (born 1986), Australian football (soccer) referee
John Gillett (1925–1995), British film critic
John H. Gillett (1860–1920), Justice of the Indiana Supreme Court
Les Gillett (born 1970), English international indoor and lawn bowls player
Leslie Gillett (1881–1969), American football coach
Lucy Gillett (born 1993), professional footballer and goalkeeper
Margaret Clark Gillett (1878-1962), British botanist and social reformer
Mark Gillett, British software engineer and executive
Mary Gillett (born 1958), Australian former politician
Matt Gillett (born 1988), Australian Rugby League player
Max Gillett (1927–2011), Australian politician
Sir Michael Cavenagh Gillett (1907–1971), British ambassador
Michael Gillett (born 1973), Australian former professional rugby league footballer
Nicholas Gillett (disambiguation)
Sir Peter Gillett (1913–1989), British Army officer
Ray Gillett (1917–1995), Australian rules footballer 
Sir Robin Gillett (1925–2009), British merchant navy captain, Lord Mayor of London
Sarah Gillett (born 1956), British ambassador
Simon Gillett (born 1985), English footballer
Simon Gillett (rower), Australian lightweight rower
Stephen Gillett (born 1976), American businessman
Tyler Gillett (born 1982), American film director, cinematographer, writer and producer
Violet Gillett (1898–1996), Canadian painter and educator

See also
Gillette (surname)